A Doggone Christmas is a 2016 American children's film about a telepathic dog. it starred Just Jesse the Jack Russell, a dog who is a YouTube star. He is an internet sensation, well-known for his "Useful Dog Tricks" viral video series on YouTube. He has over 76 Million views on YouTube alone. It was followed by the sequel A Doggone Hollywood and "A Doggone Adventure".

Cast
Jaret Sacrey as Agent Shepard
Dominique Swain as Dr. Langley
Troy Fromin as Agent Don
Jesse the Jack Russell Terrier as Murphy

See also
 List of Christmas films

References

External links

A Doggone Christmas at Letterbox DVD

2016 films
Films directed by Jim Wynorski
American children's films
American Christmas films
2010s Christmas films
2010s English-language films
2010s American films